SS Howard E. Coffin was a Liberty ship built in the United States during World War II. She was named after Howard E. Coffin, one of the founders of the Hudson Motor Car Company and a charter member of The Society of Automotive Engineers and president in 1910.

Construction
Howard E. Coffin was laid down on 30 November 1943, under a Maritime Commission (MARCOM) contract, MC hull 1512, by J.A. Jones Construction, Brunswick, Georgia; she was sponsored by Mrs. Alfred W. Jones, and launched on 21 January 1944.

History
She was allocated to the South Atlantic Steamship Lines, on 31 January 1944. On 18 July 1946, she was laid up in the National Defense Reserve Fleet in the James River Group, Lee Hall, Virginia. On 20 January 1947, she was turned over to the Italian Government, which in turn sold it to Villian & Fassio, Genoa, for $544,566, on 30 January 1947. She was renamed Patrizia Fassio. She was scrapped in October 1968.

References

Bibliography

 
 
 
 
 

 

Liberty ships
Ships built in Brunswick, Georgia
1944 ships
James River Reserve Fleet
Liberty ships transferred to Italy